Edward or Ed Morris may refer to:

 Edward Morris (businessman) (1866–1913), president of Morris & Company
 Edward Morris (cricketer) (1849–1928), English cricketer
 Edward Morris (historian) (1940–2016), British art historian
 Edward Morris (footballer) (1872–?), Welsh footballer
 Edward Morris, 1st Baron Morris (1859–1935), lawyer and Prime Minister of Newfoundland
 Edward Craig Morris (1939–2006), American archaeologist
 Edward Ellis Morris (1843–1902), educationist and writer in Australia
 Edward James Morris (1915–1999), Royal Air Force officer
 Edward Joy Morris (1815–1881), U.S. Representative from Pennsylvania
 Edward Lyman Morris (1870–1913), American botanist
 Edward Parmelee Morris (1853–1938), American classicist
 Edward Morris (basketball) (born 1984), American basketball player
 Edward H. Morris (1858–1943), American lawyer
 Edward Morris (bowls) (born 1988), English lawn bowler
 Ed Morris (1880s pitcher) (1862–1937), Major League Baseball pitcher
 Ed Morris (1920s pitcher) (1899–1932), Major League Baseball pitcher
 Eddie Morris (born 19??), rapper and break dancer, member of Grandmaster Flash and the Furious Five

See also
 Morris (surname)